Drslavice is a municipality and village in Uherské Hradiště District in the Zlín Region of the Czech Republic. It has about 500 inhabitants.

History
The first written mention of Drslavice is from 1373.

Notable people
Adolf Jellinek (1821–1893), Austrian rabbi and scholar
Hermann Jellinek (1822–1848), Austrian writer, journalist and revolutionary

References

Villages in Uherské Hradiště District
Shtetls